VinayaPatrika (Letter of petition) is a devotional poem composed by the 16th-century Indian poet, Goswami Tulsidas, containing hymns to different Hindu deities especially to Lord Rama in extreme humility (Vinaya).

The language of the text is Braj Bhasha.

Vinaya Patrika is an important work of medieval Hindi Literature and Bhakti movement.

Origin
According to Swami Yatiswarananda, when Kaal—the embodiment of evil—threatened to devour Tulsidas, he prayed to Hanuman who appeared to him in a dream. Hanuman advised him to file a petition to Rama to remedy the evil, and that was the origin of the Vinaya-Patrika.”

Structure
Vinaya Patrika has been written as a petition against the six passions (Lust, Wrath, Greed, Inebriation, Attachments, Ego) and  nine vices (Violence, Falsehood, Pride, Envy, Strife, Suspicion, Jealousy, Rivalry and Covetousness) of Kali Yuga, the plaintiff is Tulsidas himself, though he represents the entire humanity. The judges addressed are Lord Rama, Sita, Lakshmana, Bharat and Shatrughan.

It also comprises popular devotional hymns (Stutis) to various Hindu Gods, like Ganesha, Surya, Devi, Ganga, Hanuman, Sita, Rama and also the city of Kashi. The book has now been translated into many languages, including English (Translator: F. R. Allchin)  Hindi translation (Translator: Gita Press) you can read at vedicaim

Popular hymns from Vinaya Patrika

 Shri Ramchandra Kripalu (Rama)
 Gaiye Ganpati Jagbandan (Ganesha)
 Jai Jai Jagjanani Devi (Kali)
 Jai Jai Bhagrathnandini (Ganga)

See also
 Hindi literature

References

Sources

External links

 Vinaya Patrika Text in Roman Script
 Stuti of Hanuman from Vinaya Patrika

Hindu texts
Hindi poetry collections
16th-century books
Bhakti movement